José Antonio Irulegui Garmendia (born 1 April 1937) is a Spanish former football defender and manager.

Playing career
Born in Lasarte-Oria, Gipuzkoa, Basque Country, Irulegui played professional football with SD Eibar, Real Sociedad and Pontevedra CF, in a career that lasted 16 years. He amassed La Liga totals of 249 matches and one goal over 11 seasons.

Irulegui left the Galician club in June 1971 at the age of 34, after one final campaign in Segunda División. He retired after one year with Tercera División side Real Murcia.

Coaching career
Irulegui worked as a manager for nearly three decades, starting with second-tier Deportivo de La Coruña in 1973–74 (only five games in charge, team relegation followed by immediate promotion). He went on to coach Real Sociedad, RCD Español, Real Murcia, Real Burgos CF, Xerez CD, Levante UD, Deportivo Alavés, RCD Mallorca and Villarreal CF.

Irulegui led the last of those clubs to promotion to the top flight in the 1997–98 season, in the playoffs. He was relieved of his duties late into the following campaign, which ended in immediate relegation.

References

External links

1937 births
Living people
People from Lasarte-Oria
Spanish footballers
Footballers from the Basque Country (autonomous community)
Association football defenders
La Liga players
Segunda División players
Tercera División players
SD Eibar footballers
Real Sociedad footballers
Pontevedra CF footballers
Real Murcia players
Spain under-21 international footballers
Spanish football managers
La Liga managers
Segunda División managers
Segunda División B managers
Tercera División managers
Deportivo de La Coruña managers
Real Sociedad managers
RCD Espanyol managers
Real Murcia managers
Real Burgos CF managers
Xerez CD managers
Levante UD managers
Deportivo Alavés managers
RCD Mallorca managers
Villarreal CF managers